Coeur d'Alene River Wildlife Management Area at  is an Idaho wildlife management area primarily in Kooteani County but also in Benewah County. The majority of the WMA is located in the Thompson Lake Segment along the Coeur d'Alene River, but portions are also located along the St. Joe River in the upper sections of Lake Coeur d'Alene near Heyburn State Park. Land acquisition for the WMA began in 1964.

The WMA is managed for migratory and resident waterfowl and was created to enhance waterfowl habitat and production. Ruffed grouse, American coots, and snowshoe hare are found in the WMA, among other wildlife. Part of the Trail of the Coeur d'Alenes travels through the WMA.

References

Protected areas established in 1964
Protected areas of Benewah County, Idaho
Protected areas of Kootenai County, Idaho
Wildlife management areas of Idaho